Nanded is a city and a municipal corporation in the state of Maharashtra, India. The literacy rate of the city is 87.40%. Nanded district has a geographical area of 10,422 km2.

There are a total of 504 High Schools (Secondary/Sr Secondary schools) in Nanded district. The district has a Government Polytechnic, Government Aided Engineering College and Government Medical College. Swami Ramanand Teerth Marathwada University (SRTMU) has 129 college affiliations.

This is a list of reputed educational institutions in Nanded.

University
 Swami Ramanand Teerth Marathwada University

Medical
 Dr. Shankarrao Chavan Government Medical College (DSCGMC), Vishnupuri
 Government Ayurvedic (BAMS) College, Nanded
 Nanded Rural Dental College & Research Center, Pangri Dist-Nanded
 Padmashri Dr. Shyamrao Kadam Homeopathy (BHMS) College, Nanded
 Unani (BUMS) Rasshala

Engineering
 Shri Guru Gobind Singhji Institute of Engineering and Technology (SGGS) - Autonomous
 Mahatma Gandhi Mission's (MGM) College of Engineering, Nanded
 Matoshri Prathistan's Engineering College
 Gramin College of Engineering, Vishnupuri

Pharmacy
 Nanded Pharmacy College, Patnoorkar Nagar
 Indira Institute of Pharmacy, Vishnupuri

Law 
 Narayan Rao Chavan Law College, Visava Nagar, Nanded
 SP Law College

Management
 Indira Institute of Management, Vishnupuri, Nanded
 Matoshri Pratishthan's School of Management, Jijau Nagar, Khupsarwadi, Nanded
 Nandigram  Institute of Management Studies, Pangri Vishnupuri, Nanded

Arts, Science and Commerce
 Peoples College Nanded
 Science College Nanded
 Government polytechnic, Nanded
 Yeshwant Mahavidhyalaya
 Madeena-Tul-Uloom College
 Netaji SubhashChandraa Bose College (NSB)
 MGM's College of Computer Science & IT, Nanded 
 Rajiv Gandhi College [RGC]
 N.E.S. Science College, Nanded
 Vasantrao Naik College, Vasarni, Nanded
 S.S.B.'S Institute of Technology & Management (ITM), V.I.P Road, Nanded
 Indira Gandhi Senior College, CIDCO, Nanded
 Al-Suffa College of Science, Arts & Comm., Nanded
 Rajiv Gandhi College of Computer Sci.& Management, Vidhyut Nagar, Nanded
 Marathwada Institute of Computer Science, Manik Nagar, Taroda, Nanded
 B.S.S.S's Mayur College of Information Technology & Management, Anand Nagar, Nanded
 Late Laxmanraoji  Information Technology College, Manik Nagar, Nanded
 Vasant Kale College of Computational & Management, Vishnupuri, Nanded
 College of Computer Science & I.T., Nanded
 Mahatma Gandhi College of Architecture, Pokharni, Nanded
 Vishvbharti Mahavidyalaya, CIDCO, Nanded
 Information Technology College, Godavari Complex, Nanded
 K.R.M. Mahila Arts & Comm Mahavidyalaya, Vazirabad, Nanded
 Sharda Bhavan Education Society's College of Education, V.I.P. Road, Nanded.
 Smt. Indira Gandhi Adhyapak Mahavidyalaya, Vasarni, Nanded
 Vivek Vardhini Mahila Adhyapak Mahavidyalaya, Visava Nagar, Nanded
 Yeshwant College of Physical Education, CIDCO, Nanded
 Sahyog Seva Bhavi Sanstha's College  of Education Vishnupuri, Nanded
 Pradnya Pratishtan's Adhyaapak Mahavidyalaya, Purna Road, Nanded
 G.S.P.M.'s Gramin Science Vocational College, Vishnupuri, Nanded
 Sidharth  College & Shikshan Parbodhani College, Tadoda, Nanded
 Sharda Bhavan Education Society's Academe of Architecture, Nanded
 Potdar College, Dhangarwadi, Latur Road, Nanded
 Raje Mahendra (Night) College, Rajashri Shahoo Nagar, Nanded
 Gurukul Public School & Junior College, Pawdewadi, Nanded

Schools, Junior Colleges
 Gyan Mata Vidya Vihar Senior Secondary School 
 Holy City Public School
 Faizul Uloom Primary School, High School & Junior College
 Yusufiya Primary School, High School and Junior College
 Madeena-Tul-Uloom High School and Junior College
 Universal English Medium School
  Kamtha Chowk, Maltekri Road, Kamtha (kh.) Nanded - 431605 www.universalschool.in/8600006060
 Cambridge Vidyalaya
 Mahatma Phule Vidyalaya
 Nagarjuna Public School
 Sandeepani Public School
 Kids Kingdom Public School
 Sana Urdu Primary School, High School & Junior College
 Al-Rizwan Jr. College & Group Of Schools
 Gujarati High School
 Pratibha Niketan High School
 Iqra Urdu Primary School, High School & Junior College
 Kendriya Vidyalaya SCR Nanded
 Sana International School
 Dar-Al-Arqam Public School
 Olive Tree English School

References 

 
Lists of universities and colleges in Maharashtra